Consort Ji (繼妃 烏拉那拉氏) of the Ula Nara clan was the second primary consort of Hong Taiji.

Family 

 Father: Bokdo - held the title of beile (博克多;?-1607)
 Grandfather: Buyan, Tailan's son; first beile and founder of the Ula state.

Her father and uncle were beheaded during Battle of Wujieyan, part of Nurhachi 's war to conquer the Jurchen tribes.

Wanli era 
The exact date of birth of Lady Ula Nara is unknown. Her father died in the thirty-fifth year of Wanli of the Ming Dynasty.

It is unknown whether Lady Nara became Huang Taiji 's wife afterwards due to the defeat of the Ula tribe.

In the thirty-seventh year of Wanli era (1609), on March 13, she gave birth to his eldest son, Hooge. In the thirty-ninth year of Wanli, she gave birth his second son, who would die prematurely in 1621. On 3 April 1621, she gave birth to his eldest daughter, Princess Aohan of the First Rank.

The date of Lady Nara's death is unknown, though it is possible that she died before Huang Taiji inherited the throne of Later Jin Dynasty in August in the eleventh year of Destiny. Lady Nara has never been posthumously conferred a title of Empress.

Titles 

 During the reign of Wanli Emperor (1563–1620)
 Lady Ula Nara
 Primary Consort (嫡福晋)
 During the reign of Hong Taiji (r. 1626–1643):
 Consort Ji (繼妃)

Issue 
As a primary consort:

 Hooge, Prince Suwu of the First Rank (肅武親王 豪格; 16 April 1609 – 4 May 1648), first son
 Loge (洛格; 1611 – November/December 1621), second son
 Princess Aohan of the First Rank (敖漢固倫公主; 3 April 1621 – February/March 1654), first daughter

References 

 " Manuscripts of Qing History · Biography 1" Empress
 "The Genealogy of Aixinjueluo · 星源集庆"（页二七）

17th-century Chinese women
16th-century Chinese people
Consorts of Hong Taiji